The Arena Pruszków, known until 2017 as BGŻ BNP Paribas Arena for sponsorship reasons, is a velodrome in Pruszków, Poland. Opened in 2008 as Poland's first indoor velodrome, it hosted the 2009 UCI Track Cycling World Championships. It also hosted the 2008 European Track Championships at under-23 and junior level and the 2010 European Track Championships at elite level.

It has seats for 1800 people with the capacity to install 1500 more seats. The BGŻ Arena is also home of the Polish Cycling Federation.

External links

Cycle racing in Poland
Indoor arenas in Poland
Pruszków County
Velodromes in Poland
Sports venues in Masovian Voivodeship
BGŻ Arena